Codex Vindobonensis Philos. 75 is a manuscript of the treatise On the Soul of Aristotle. It is designated by symbol Sd. Dated by a Colophon to the year 1446. It is written in Greek minuscule letters. The manuscript contains a complete text of the treatise. 

The text of the manuscript represents to the textual family ρ.

The manuscript was not cited by Tiendelenburg, Torstrik, Biehl, Apelt, and Ross in his critical editions of the treatise On the Soul. It means the manuscript has not high value. Currently it is housed at the Austrian National Library (Philos. 75) at Vienna.

Other manuscripts 

 Codex Vindobonensis Philos. 2
 Codex Vindobonensis Philos. 157

Notes and references

Further reading 

 Paweł Siwek, Aristotelis tractatus De anima graece et latine, Desclée, Romae 1965. 

15th-century manuscripts
Aristotelian manuscripts

Manuscripts of the Austrian National Library